The 2010 Wisconsin Fall General Election was held in the U.S. state of Wisconsin on November 2, 2010.  All of Wisconsin's executive and administrative officers were up for election as well as one of Wisconsin's U.S. Senate seats, Wisconsin's eight seats in the United States House of Representatives, seventeen seats in the Wisconsin State Senate, and all 99 seats in the Wisconsin State Assembly.  The 2010 Wisconsin Fall Partisan Primary was held September 14, 2010.

The Republicans swept all of the fall elections for statewide officials, except Secretary of State, winning the open seat for Governor and Lieutenant Governor, defeating an incumbent Democratic State Treasurer, and reelecting the incumbent Republican Attorney General.  They also won control of both chambers of the Wisconsin Legislature, and defeated incumbent Democratic U.S. Senator Russ Feingold and U.S. Representative Steve Kagen, and won the open U.S. House seat previously held by Democrat Dave Obey.

The 2010 Wisconsin Spring Election was held April 6, 2010.  This election featured a contested election for Wisconsin Court of Appeals and several other nonpartisan local and judicial races.  The 2010 Wisconsin Spring Primary was held on February 16, 2010.

Federal

United States Senate
 
 
Incumbent Democratic Senator Russ Feingold was challenged by Republican businessman Ron Johnson and Rob Taylor of the Constitution Party. Johnson defeated Feingold in the general election with 51.86% of the vote to Feingold's 47.02% and Taylor's 1.08%.

| colspan="6" style="text-align:center;background-color: #e9e9e9;"| General Election, November 2, 2010

United States House 

All 8 of Wisconsin's seats in the United States House of Representatives were up for election in 2010. The Republican Party gained 2 seats, taking a 5-3 majority in the Wisconsin House delegation.

State

Executive

Governor and Lieutenant Governor

Incumbent Governor Jim Doyle and Lieutenant Governor Barbara Lawton did not run for reelection.  Democrat Tom Barrett and Republican Scott Walker, along with several third-party candidates, contested the seat. Walker defeated Barrett in the general election with 52.25% of the vote to Barrett's 46.48%.

| colspan="6" style="text-align:center;background-color: #e9e9e9;"| General Election, November 2, 2010

Administrative

Attorney General
Incumbent Republican J.B. Van Hollen defeated Democrat Scott Hassett in the race for Wisconsin Attorney General, winning 57.79% of the vote to Hassett's 42.13%.

| colspan="6" style="text-align:center;background-color: #e9e9e9;"| General Election, November 2, 2010

Secretary of State
Incumbent Democrat Doug La Follette defeated Republican David King in the race for Wisconsin Secretary of State, winning 51.61% to King's 48.3%.

| colspan="6" style="text-align:center;background-color: #e9e9e9;"| General Election, November 2, 2010

Treasurer
Republican challenger Kurt W. Schuller defeated incumbent Democrat Dawn Marie Sass in the race for Wisconsin Treasurer, winning 53.39% of the vote to Sass's 46.47%.

| colspan="6" style="text-align:center;background-color: #e9e9e9;"| General Election, November 2, 2010

Legislature

State Senate
The 17 odd-numbered seats of the Wisconsin Senate were up for election in 2010. The Republican Party won control of the State Senate.

Summary

Candidates

State Assembly
All 99 seats in the Wisconsin Assembly were up for election in 2010. The Republican Party won control of the Assembly.

Summary

Judiciary

State Court of Appeals
Three seats on the Wisconsin Court of Appeals were up for election in 2010, two of those seats were contested.
 In District I, Judge Joan F. Kessler was unopposed seeking reelected to her second six-year term.
 In District II, Wisconsin Circuit Court Judge Paul F. Reilly narrowly defeated fellow-Waukesha County circuit judge Linda Van De Water, to succeed retiring judge Harry G. Snyder.
 In District IV, Dane County District Attorney Brian Blanchard defeated Richland County circuit judge Edward Leineweber, to succeed retiring judge Charles P. Dykman.

| colspan="6" style="text-align:center;background-color: #e9e9e9;"| General Election, April 6, 2010

| colspan="6" style="text-align:center;background-color: #e9e9e9;"| General Election, April 6, 2010

Notes

References

External links
Elections & Election Results  by the Wisconsin Government Accountability Board
Wisconsin Congressional Races in 2010 for campaign finance data for federal races from OpenSecrets
Wisconsin--State Races in 2010 campaign finance data for state races from Follow the Money

 
Wisconsin
Wisconsin State Legislature elections